Frederick William Chanter (25 September 1892 – 25 May 1962) was an Australian rules footballer who played with Fitzroy in the Victorian Football League (VFL).

Notes

External links 

1892 births
1962 deaths
Australian rules footballers from Victoria (Australia)
Fitzroy Football Club players
Australian military personnel of World War I